Alabaster is a city and southern suburb of Birmingham in Shelby County, Alabama, United States. At the 2020 census, the population was 33,284. Alabaster is the 16th largest city in Alabama by number of residents.

History
George L. Scott Sr., an Alabaster pioneer, owned and operated Alabaster Lime Co., which mined this mineral. His shipping point was known as “Scott Rock.” Later, worker housing was built to accommodate some of the mine employees. The community was named Alabaster after the "white calcium carbonate mineral."

The First Bank of Alabaster opened in 1952, and its president was George L. Scott Jr., who later was elected as the first mayor of Alabaster. The first attempt in 1952 to incorporate Alabaster failed. In January 1953, the petition was again filed, and on February 23, 1953, Alabaster was officially incorporated, with a favorable vote of 79 to 23, and 427 residing inhabitants.  In 1955, the Alabaster Water and Gas Board was formed.

In 2015, the city announced that it was considering options to expand the area commonly known as the "Main Street Medical Mile" along Highway 31. The plans include not just expansion of medical facilities, but a civic center and different retail locations.

Additionally, it was announced in 2017 that a 350,000 square feet retail complex would be built at the corner of Highway 31 and Interstate 65. The new complex, currently named District 31, was slated to open in 2019, however as of 2020, the complex remained under construction.

Geography
Alabaster is located at  (33.231162, −86.823829).

Alabaster mostly occupies the Cahaba and Opossum valleys, which are divided by the Pine Ridge that runs north to south. To the east and west, both valleys are flanked by parallel mountain ridges that locally run north to south, but are a part of a larger system of ridges that generally runs north-east to south-west (the tailing ends of the Appalachian foothills). The valleys are drained by small creeks (Buck Creek, Beaverdam Creek) that flow into the Cahaba River.

Access to the city from major highways is found from U.S. Route 31, which runs through the city, and via I-65 exit 238. Downtown Birmingham is 23 mi (37 km) north, and Montgomery is 69 mi (111 km) south, both via US-31 or I-65.

Climate

According to the Köppen Climate Classification system, Alabaster has a humid subtropical climate, abbreviated "Cfa" on climate maps.

Demographics

City of Alabaster (1960-)
Alabaster first appeared on the 1960 U.S. Census as an incorporated city.

2010 Census data
As of the census of 2010, there were 30,352 people, 11,016 households, and 6,482 families residing in the city [9]. The racial makeup of the city was 81.2% White, 15.0% Black or African American, 0.31% Native American, 0.64% Asian, 0.02% Pacific Islander, 2.2% from other races, and 0.69% from two or more races. 4.54% of the population were Hispanic or Latino of any race.

There were 11,016 households, out of which 41.9% had children under the age of 18 living with them, 68.0% were married couples living together, 8.9% had a female householder with no husband present, and 20.6% were non-families. 17.1% of all households were made up of individuals, and 3.6% had someone living alone who was 65 years of age or older. The average household size was 2.73 and the average family size was 3.09.

In the city, the population was spread out, with 27.7% under the age of 18, 7.0% from 18 to 24, 32.0% from 25 to 44, 25.0% from 45 to 64, and 8.0% who were 65 years of age or older. The median age was 35 years. For every 100 females, there were 94.7 males. For every 100 females age 18 and over, there were 90.7 males.

The median income for a household in the city was $64,411, and the median income for a family was $78,940.  The per capita income for the city was $22,466. About 4.3% of families and 5.9% of the population were below the poverty line, including 7.0% of those under age 18 and 12.3% of those age 65 or over.

2020 Census data

As of the 2020 United States Census, there were 33,284 people, 11,568 households, and 8,667 families residing in the city.

Alabaster-Helena Census Division (1980-)

The Alabaster-Helena Census Division was created in 1980 through the merger of the former Helena Division and Siluria Divisions. It includes portions of Alabaster, Birmingham (Shelby County portion), Brantleyville, Calera, Chelsea, Helena, Hoover, Indian Springs Village, Meadowbrook, Montevallo, Pelham and Vestavia Hills.

Government
The government consists of a mayor, who is elected at-large, and a seven-member city council. Each member is elected from a single-member district, called a ward, of roughly equal population.

The Mayor and City Council are elected every four years. The most recent election was held in 2020.

The current City Council Members are: Sophie Martin, Rick Ellis, Stacy Rakestraw, Greg Farrell, Jamie Cole, Zach Zahariadis, and Kerri Pate.

Alabaster Fire Department
ISO Class 2 rated. Consisting of 3 Firehouses with 61 Full Time Firefighters.

Alabaster Firehouse #1
Located at 890 1st Avenue West.

Alabaster Firehouse #2
Located at 950 Butler Road.

Alabaster Firehouse #3
Located at 910 1st Street South (US 31 South)

Schools
On July 1, 2013, the Alabaster City Schools System officially separated from the Shelby County Schools system, and now operates the public schools in the city. Private school K-12 education is also available.

Creek View Elementary School
Meadow View Elementary School
Thompson Intermediate School
Thompson Middle School
Thompson High School

Private:
Evangel Christian School
Kingwood Christian School (closed)

Gallery

References

External links

City of Alabaster

Cities in Alabama
Cities in Shelby County, Alabama
Birmingham metropolitan area, Alabama